The 2013 Liga Nacional Juvenil de Voleibol Femenino (Spanish for: 2013 Women's Junior National Volleyball League) or 2013 LNJVF is the 3rd edition of the Peruvian Volleyball League in the junior category (U19). The competition is open for all 12 teams who have the A1 category in the LNSV, for this season 11 out of the 12 teams signed up. Teams were made up of U19 players.

Competing Teams
Teams were seeded according to how they finished in the 2013 Youth Edition.

Competition format
The competition is divided in two phases, the group round in which teams are divided into two groups and they will play once against the other teams in the same pool, after the first round is finished, the top three teams will move on to the next round. The final round is a single round-robyn with all six teams playing one against the other 5, including the teams that had already played each other in the group round, the top team ranking wise will be named champion.

Individual awards

Most Valuable Player
Milagros Rodríguez (Géminis)
Best Outside Hitters
Hilary Palma (Sporting Cristal)
Ángela Leyva (Universidad San Martín)
Best Opposite
Milagros Rodríguez (Géminis)

Best Middle-Blockers
Coraima Gómez (Alianza Lima)
Andrea Urrutia (Universidad San Martín)
Best Setter
Shiamara Almeida (Sporting Cristal)
Best Libero
Violeta Delgado (Géminis)

References

External links
LNSV
Voleibol.pe

Volleyball competitions in Peru
2013 in Peruvian sport